Susan Pia Graber (born July 5, 1949) is an American attorney and jurist. She is a Senior United States circuit judge of the United States Court of Appeals for the Ninth Circuit. A native of Oklahoma, she was the 90th justice of the Oregon Supreme Court from 1990 to 1998. She served on the Oregon Court of Appeals from 1988 to 1990.

Early life
Graber was born in Oklahoma City, Oklahoma, on July 5, 1949 to a Jewish family. After high school Graber attended Wellesley College in Wellesley, Massachusetts. She graduated from Wellesley with a Bachelor of Arts degree in 1969, Phi Beta Kappa. Graber attended Yale Law School where she earned her Juris Doctor in 1972. She attended Yale with Hillary Rodham (now Clinton) and Bill Clinton.

Legal career
Upon graduation Graber became an assistant attorney general for the New Mexico Bureau of Revenue, where she continued until 1974. That year she entered private law practice in Santa Fe, New Mexico, until 1975. In 1975 she moved to Ohio where she returned to private practice, this time in Cincinnati, until 1978. Then in 1978 Graber moved to Portland, Oregon, where she became an associate at Stoel Rives Boley Jones and Grey (now Stoel Rives LLP). In 1981 she became a partner. In 1986, the Northwest Women’s Law Center gave her their Founder’s Award to recognize her pro bono service. In 1983, while she was a practicing attorney, Graber was designated to serve occasionally as a state district court judge on a temporary or pro tempore basis when the regular judges of the court were unavailable. She also served as a mediator for the United States District Court for the District of Oregon from 1986 to 1988.

Judicial career

Oregon court of appeals
Graber began her career as a judge when Governor Neil Goldschmidt appointed her to the Oregon Court of Appeals. She was appointed on February 11, 1988, to replace judge Thomas F. Young, who had died in office. Graber served on the court of appeals until May 2, 1990. While on the bench she served as president of the Oregon Appellate Judges Association.

Oregon Supreme Court
On May 2, 1990, Graber was appointed to the Oregon Supreme Court by Governor Goldschmidt to replace Robert E. Jones. However, Jones, prior to resigning his position, filed for re-election and won the election. Thus Jones resigned a second time and Goldschmidt appointed Graber a second time on January 7, 1991. She became the second woman to serve on that court, following Betty Roberts. Graber then won election to a full six-year term in 1992, but resigned on April 1, 1998, before the term expired. While on the court she was considered to be a candidate for appointment to the United States Supreme Court.

Federal judicial service
On July 30, 1997, President Bill Clinton nominated Graber to the United States Court of Appeals for the Ninth Circuit to replace Judge Edward Leavy, who assumed senior status. She was subsequently confirmed by the United States Senate by a 98–0 vote on March 17, 1998. She received her commission on March 19, 1998. With her appointment she became the first female judge to serve on that court from the state of Oregon.

In 1998, the Classroom Law Project named her Legal Citizen of the Year, and in 2001 she received the Oregon For Country Award from Yale University. Graber was selected to be chairperson of the American Bar Association’s Committee on Appellate Practice in 2001. She has served on two committees of the United States Judicial Conference: Committee on State-Federal Jurisdiction (2010–13) and Committee on Rules of Practice and Procedure (2013–16).

Judge Graber on February 11, 2021, announced her intention to assume senior status upon appointment of her successor. She assumed senior status on December 15, 2021, when her successor, Jennifer Sung was confirmed by the United States Senate.

Notable rulings
In 2006, Graber upheld a 159-year mandatory minimum sentence imposed on a mentally handicapped getaway driver.

On November 30, 2021, Graber wrote the majority opinion in Duncan v. Bonta, a major 2nd amendment case that dealt with a law regulating high-capacity gun magazines, specifically, the law prohibits gun magazines that hold more than 10 bullets. Graber and the 7-4 majority found that the law does not violate the 2nd amendment.

See also
 List of Jewish American jurists
 List of first women lawyers and judges in Oregon

References

External links

1949 births
Living people
20th-century American Jews
20th-century American judges
20th-century American women judges
21st-century American Jews
21st-century American judges
21st-century American women judges
Jewish American attorneys
Judges of the United States Court of Appeals for the Ninth Circuit
Lawyers from Oklahoma City
Lawyers from Portland, Oregon
New Mexico lawyers
Ohio lawyers
Oregon Court of Appeals judges
Oregon state court judges
Justices of the Oregon Supreme Court
Politicians from Oklahoma City
United States court of appeals judges appointed by Bill Clinton
Wellesley College alumni
Yale Law School alumni